Huawei Nova 8 is a smartphone manufactured by Huawei. It is a part of Huawei Nova series. It was announced on August 5, 2021.

References 

Huawei smartphones
Mobile phones introduced in 2021